The Ministry of Regional Integration and International Cooperation is a government ministry, responsible for relations with intergovernmental organisations, such as SADC. The incumbent minister is Sibusiso Moyo and the deputy minister is Reuben Marumahoko.

References

Government of Zimbabwe